Psycho is a 1960 American psychological horror thriller film produced and directed by Alfred Hitchcock. The screenplay, written by Joseph Stefano, was based on the 1959 novel of the same name by Robert Bloch. The film stars Anthony Perkins, Janet Leigh, Vera Miles, John Gavin and Martin Balsam. The plot centers on an encounter between on-the-run embezzler Marion Crane (Leigh) and shy motel proprietor Norman Bates (Perkins) and its aftermath, in which a private investigator (Balsam), Marion's lover Sam Loomis (Gavin), and her sister Lila (Miles) investigate her disappearance.

Psycho was seen as a departure from Hitchcock's previous film North by Northwest, as it was filmed on a lower budget in black-and-white by the crew of his television series Alfred Hitchcock Presents. The film was initially considered controversial and received mixed reviews, but audience interest and outstanding box-office returns prompted a major critical re-evaluation. Psycho was nominated for four Academy Awards, including Best Director for Hitchcock and Best Supporting Actress for Leigh.

Psycho is now considered one of Hitchcock's best films, and is arguably his most famous work. It has been praised as a major work of cinematic art by international film critics and scholars due to its slick direction, tense atmosphere, impressive camerawork, a memorable score and iconic performances. Often ranked among the greatest films of all time, it set a new level of acceptability for violence, deviant behavior and sexuality in American films, and is widely considered to be one of the earliest examples of the slasher film genre.

After Hitchcock's death in 1980, Universal Pictures produced follow-ups: three sequels, a remake, a made-for-television spin-off, and a television series set in the 2010s. In 1992, the Library of Congress deemed the film "culturally, historically, or aesthetically significant" and selected it for preservation in the United States National Film Registry.

Plot
During a Friday afternoon tryst in a Phoenix hotel, real estate secretary Marion Crane and her boyfriend Sam Loomis discuss their inability to get married because of Sam's debts. Marion returns to work, steals a cash payment of $40,000 entrusted to her for deposit, and sets off to drive to Sam's home in Fairvale, California. Marion hurriedly trades her car en route, arousing suspicion from both the car dealer and a California Highway Patrol officer.

Marion stops for the night at the Bates Motel, located off the main highway, and hides the stolen money inside a newspaper. Proprietor Norman Bates descends from a large house overlooking the motel, registers Marion under an assumed name, and invites her to dine with him. After Norman returns to his house, Marion overhears Norman arguing with his mother about Marion's presence. Norman returns with a light meal and apologizes for his mother's outbursts. Norman discusses his hobby as a taxidermist, his mother's "illness", and how people have a "private trap" they want to escape. Marion decides to drive back to Phoenix in the morning and return the stolen money. As Marion showers, a shadowy figure in a dress appears and stabs her to death. Soon afterward, Norman cleans up the murder scene, putting Marion's body, belongings, and the hidden cash in her car, and sinks it in a swamp.

Marion's sister Lila arrives in Fairvale a week later, tells Sam about the theft, and demands to know her whereabouts. He denies knowing anything about her disappearance. A private investigator named Arbogast approaches them, saying that he has been hired to retrieve the money. Arbogast stops at the Bates Motel and questions Norman, whose nervous behavior and inconsistent answers arouse his suspicion. He examines the guest register and discovers from her handwriting that Marion spent a night in the motel. When Arbogast learns that Marion had spoken to Norman's mother, Arbogast asks to speak to her, but Norman refuses it. Arbogast updates Sam and Lila about his search and promises to meet them within an hour at Sam's home. After he enters the Bates home to search for Norman's mother, the shadowy figure emerges from the bedroom and stabs him to death.

Sam visits the motel with Lila when they hear nothing from Arbogast, worried something went wrong. He sees a figure in the house who he assumes is Norman's mother. Lila and Sam alert the local sheriff, who tells them Norman's mother died in a murder–suicide, by strychnine poisoning, ten years earlier. The sheriff suggests Arbogast lied to Sam and Lila so he could pursue Marion and the money. Convinced that something happened to Arbogast, Lila and Sam drive to the motel. Sam distracts Norman in the office while Lila sneaks into the house. Suspicious, Norman becomes agitated and knocks Sam unconscious. As he goes to the house, Lila hides in the fruit cellar, where she discovers the mother's mummified body. She screams, and Norman, wearing women's clothes and a wig, enters the cellar and tries to stab her. Sam appears and subdues him.

At the police station, a psychiatrist explains that Norman killed his mother and her lover ten years earlier out of jealousy. Unable to bear the guilt, Norman mummified his mother's corpse and began treating it as if she was still alive. He recreated his mother as an alternate personality, as jealous and possessive towards Norman as he felt about his mother. When Norman is attracted to a woman, "Mother" takes over. He had killed two other missing young women before Marion and Arbogast. The psychiatrist concludes that "Mother" has now submerged Norman's personality. Norman sits in a jail cell and hears his mother saying the murders were all his doing. Marion's car is retrieved from the swamp.

Cast

 Anthony Perkins as Norman Bates
 Vera Miles as Lila Crane
 John Gavin as Sam Loomis
 Martin Balsam as Private Investigator Arbogast
 John McIntire as Deputy Sheriff Al Chambers
 Simon Oakland as Dr. Richmond
 Frank Albertson as Tom Cassidy
 Pat Hitchcock as Caroline
 Vaughn Taylor as George Lowery
 Lurene Tuttle as Mrs. Chambers
 John Anderson as California Charlie
 Mort Mills as Highway Patrol Officer
 Janet Leigh as Marion Crane

Virginia Gregg, Paul Jasmin, and Jeanette Nolan make uncredited appearances as the voice of Norma "Mother" Bates. The three voices were used interchangeably, except for the last speech, which was performed by Gregg.

Production

Development
Psycho is based on Robert Bloch's 1959 novel of the same name, loosely inspired by the case of convicted Wisconsin murderer and grave robber Ed Gein. Both Gein, who lived only  from Bloch, and the story's protagonist Norman Bates, were solitary murderers in isolated rural locations. Each had deceased, domineering mothers, had sealed off a room in their home as a shrine to them, and dressed in women's clothes. Gein was apprehended after killing only twice.

Peggy Robertson, Hitchcock's long-time assistant, read Anthony Boucher's positive review of the novel in his "Criminals at Large" column in The New York Times and decided to show the book to her employer; however, studio readers at Paramount Pictures had already rejected its premise for a film. Hitchcock acquired rights to the novel for $9,500 and reportedly ordered Robertson to buy all copies to preserve the novel's surprises. Hitchcock, who had come to face genre competitors whose works were critically compared to his own, was seeking new material to recover from two aborted projects with Paramount: Flamingo Feather and No Bail for the Judge. He disliked stars' salary demands and trusted only a few people to choose prospective material, including Robertson.

Paramount executives balked at Hitchcock's proposal and refused to provide his usual budget. In response, Hitchcock offered to film Psycho quickly and cheaply in black and white using his Alfred Hitchcock Presents television series crew. Paramount executives rejected this cost-conscious approach, claiming their sound stages were booked, but the industry was in a slump. Hitchcock countered that he personally would finance the project and film it at Universal-International using his Shamley Productions crew if Paramount would distribute. In lieu of his usual $250,000 director's fee, he proposed a 60% stake in the film negative. This combined offer was accepted, and Hitchcock went ahead in spite of naysaying from producer Herbert Coleman and Shamley Productions executive Joan Harrison.

Screenplay

James P. Cavanagh, a writer on Alfred Hitchcock Presents, wrote the first draft of the screenplay. Hitchcock felt the script dragged and read like a television short horror story, an assessment shared by an assistant. Although Joseph Stefano had worked on only one film before, Hitchcock agreed to meet with him; despite Stefano's inexperience, the meeting went well and he was hired.

The screenplay is relatively faithful to the novel, with a few significant changes by Hitchcock and Stefano. Stefano found the character of Norman Bates unsympathetic—in the book, he is middle-aged, overweight, and more overtly unstable—but became more intrigued when Hitchcock suggested casting Anthony Perkins. Stefano eliminated Bates' drinking, which evidently necessitated removing Bates' "becoming" the mother personality when in a drunken stupor. Also gone is Bates' interest in spiritualism, the occult and pornography. Hitchcock and Stefano elected to open the film with scenes in Marion's life and not introduce Bates at all until 20 minutes into the film rather than open with Bates reading a history book as Bloch does. Writer Joseph W. Smith observes that "her story occupies only two of the novel's 17 chapters. Hitchcock and Stefano expanded this to nearly half the narrative". He likewise mentions the absence of a hotel tryst between Marion and Sam in the novel. For Stefano, the conversation between Marion and Norman in the hotel parlor in which she displays a maternal sympathy towards him makes it possible for the audience to switch their sympathies towards Norman Bates after Marion's murder. When Lila Crane is looking through Norman's room in the film, she opens a book with a blank cover whose contents are unseen; in the novel, these are "pathologically pornographic" illustrations. Stefano wanted to give the audience "indications that something was quite wrong, but it could not be spelled out or overdone". In his book of conversations with Hitchcock, François Truffaut says the novel "cheats" by having extended conversations between Norman and "Mother" and stating what Mother is "doing" at various given moments.

The first name of the female protagonist was changed from Mary to Marion because a real Mary Crane existed in Phoenix. Also changed is the novel's budding romance between Sam and Lila. Hitchcock preferred to focus the audience's attention on the solution to the mystery, and Stefano thought such a relationship would make Sam Loomis seem cheap. Instead of having Sam explain Norman's pathology to Lila, the film uses a psychiatrist. Stefano was in therapy dealing with his relationship with his own mother while writing the script. The novel is more violent than the film: Marion is beheaded in the shower rather than being stabbed to death. Minor changes include changing Marion's telltale earring found after her death to a scrap of paper that failed to flush down the toilet. This provided some shock effect because toilets almost were never seen in American cinema in the 1960s. The location of Arbogast's death was moved from the foyer to the stairwell. Stefano thought this would make it easier to conceal the truth about "Mother" without tipping that something was being hidden. As Janet Leigh put it, this gave Hitchcock more options for his camera.

Pre-production
Paramount, whose contract guaranteed another film by Hitchcock, did not want Hitchcock to make Psycho. Paramount was expecting No Bail for the Judge starring Audrey Hepburn, who became pregnant and had to bow out, leading Hitchcock to scrap the production. Their official stance was that the book was "too repulsive" and "impossible for films", and nothing but another of his star-studded mystery thrillers would suffice. They did not like "anything about it at all" and denied him his usual budget. In response Hitchcock financed the film's creation through his own Shamley Productions, shooting at Universal Studios under the Revue television unit. The original Bates Motel and Bates house set buildings, which were constructed on the same stage as Lon Chaney's The Phantom of the Opera, are still standing at the Universal Studios backlot in Universal City near Hollywood and are a regular attraction on the studio's tour. As a further result of cost cutting, Hitchcock chose to film Psycho in black and white, keeping the budget under $1 million. Other reasons for shooting in black and white were his desire to prevent the shower scene from being too gory.

To keep costs down, and because he was most comfortable around them, Hitchcock took most of his crew from his television series Alfred Hitchcock Presents, including the cinematographer, set designer, script supervisor, and first assistant director. He hired regular collaborators Bernard Herrmann as music composer, George Tomasini as editor, and Saul Bass for the title design and storyboarding of the shower scene. In all, his crew cost $62,000.

Through the strength of his reputation, Hitchcock cast Leigh for a quarter of her usual fee, paying only $25,000 (in the 1967 book Hitchcock/Truffaut, Hitchcock said that Leigh owed Paramount one final film on her seven-year contract which she had signed in 1953). His first choice, Leigh agreed having only read the novel and making no inquiry into her salary. Her co-star, Anthony Perkins, agreed to $40,000. Both stars were experienced and proven box-office draws.

Paramount distributed the film, but four years later Hitchcock sold his stock in Shamley to Universal's parent company (MCA) and his remaining six films were made at and distributed by Universal Pictures. After another four years, Paramount sold all rights to Universal.

Filming
The film, independently produced and financed by Hitchcock, was shot at Revue Studios, the same location as his television show. Psycho was shot on a tight budget of $807,000, beginning on November 11, 1959, and ending on February 1, 1960. Filming started in the morning and finished by six p.m. or earlier on Thursdays (when Hitchcock and his wife would dine at Chasen's). Nearly the whole film was shot with 50 mm lenses on 35 mm cameras. This provided an angle of view similar to human vision, which helped to further involve the audience.

Before shooting began in November, Hitchcock dispatched assistant director Hilton A. Green to Phoenix to scout locations and shoot the opening scene. The shot was supposed to be an aerial shot of Phoenix that slowly zoomed into the hotel window of a passionate Marion and Sam. Ultimately, the helicopter footage proved too shaky and had to be spliced with footage from the studio. Another crew filmed day and night footage on Highway 99 between Gorman and Fresno, California for projection when Marion drives from Phoenix. Footage of her driving into Bakersfield to trade her car is also shown. They also provided the location shots for the scene in which she is discovered sleeping in her car by the highway patrolman. In one street scene shot in downtown Phoenix, Christmas decorations were discovered to be visible; rather than re-shoot the footage, Hitchcock chose to add a graphic to the opening scene marking the date as "Friday, December the Eleventh".

Green also took photos of a prepared list of 140 locations for later reconstruction in the studio. These included many real estate offices and homes such as those belonging to Marion and her sister. He also found a girl who looked just like he imagined Marion and photographed her whole wardrobe, which would enable Hitchcock to demand realistic looks from Helen Colvig, the wardrobe supervisor. The look of the Bates house was modeled on Edward Hopper's painting House by the Railroad, a fanciful portrait of the Second Empire Victorian home at 18 Conger Avenue in Haverstraw, New York.

Lead actors Perkins and Leigh were given freedom to interpret their roles and improvise as long as it did not involve moving the camera. An example of Perkins's improvisation is Norman's habit of eating candy corn. Throughout filming, Hitchcock created and hid various versions of the "Mother corpse" prop in Leigh's dressing room closet. Leigh took the joke well, and she wondered whether it was done to keep her in suspense or to judge which corpse would be scarier for the audience.

Hitchcock was forced uncharacteristically to do retakes for some scenes. The final shot in the shower scene, which starts with an extreme close-up on Marion's eye and zooms in and out, proved difficult for Leigh because the water splashing in her eyes made her want to blink, and the cameraman had trouble as well because he had to manually focus while moving the camera. Retakes were required for the opening scene because Hitchcock felt that Leigh and Gavin were not passionate enough. Leigh had trouble saying "Not inordinately" for the real estate office scene, requiring additional retakes. Lastly, the scene in which "Mother" is discovered required complicated coordination of the chair turning around, Vera Miles (as Lila Crane) hitting the light bulb, and a lens flare, which proved to be difficult. Hitchcock forced retakes until all three elements were effected to his satisfaction.

According to Hitchcock, a series of shots with Arbogast going up the stairs in the Bates house before he is stabbed were done by assistant director Hilton A. Green, working with storyboard artist Saul Bass' drawings only while Hitchcock was incapacitated with the common cold. However, upon viewing the dailies of the shots, Hitchcock was forced to scrap them. He claimed they were "no good" because they did not portray "an innocent person but a sinister man who was going up those stairs". Hitchcock later re-shot the scene, though a little of the cut footage made its way into the film. Filming the murder of Arbogast proved problematic, owing to the overhead camera angle necessary to hide the film's twist. A camera track constructed on pulleys alongside the stairway together with a chairlike device had to be constructed and thoroughly tested over a period of weeks.

Alfred Hitchcock's cameo is a signature occurrence in most of his films. In Psycho, he can be seen through a window—wearing a Stetson hat—standing outside Marion Crane's office. Wardrobe mistress Rita Riggs has said that Hitchcock chose this scene for his cameo so that he could be in a scene with his daughter, who played one of Marion's colleagues. Others have suggested that he chose this early appearance in the film in order to avoid distracting the audience.

Shower scene
The murder of Leigh's character in the shower is the film's pivotal scene and one of the best-known in all of cinema. As such, it spawned numerous myths and legends. It was shot from December 17–23, 1959, after Leigh had twice postponed the filming, first because of a cold and then because of her period. The finished scene runs some three minutes, and its flurry of action and edits has produced contradictory attempts to count its parts. Hitchcock himself contributed to this pattern, telling Truffaut that "there were seventy camera setups for forty-five seconds of footage", and maintaining to other interviewers that there were "seventy-eight pieces of film". The 2017 documentary 78/52: Hitchcock's Shower Scene, by director Alexandre O. Philippe, latches onto this last figure for the production's tagline, '78 Shots & 52 Cuts That Changed Cinema Forever'. But in his careful description of the shower scene, film scholar Philip J. Skerry counted only 60 separate shots, with a table breaking down the middle 34 by type, camera position, angle, movement, focus, POV, and subject. Absent an alternative tabulation, Richard Schickel and Frank Capra, in their 2001 book The Men Who Made the Movies, concluded the most reasonable calculation was 60. Many are close-ups, including extreme close-ups, except for medium shots in the shower directly before and directly after the murder. The combination of the close shots with their short duration makes the sequence feel more subjective than if the images were presented alone or in a wider angle, an example of the technique Hitchcock described as "transferring the menace from the screen into the mind of the audience".

To capture the straight-on shot of the shower head, the camera had to be equipped with a long lens. The inner holes on the shower head were blocked and the camera placed a sufficient distance away so that the water, while appearing to be aimed directly at the lens, actually went around and past it.

The soundtrack of screeching violins, violas, and cellos was an original all-strings piece by composer Bernard Herrmann titled "The Murder". Hitchcock originally intended to have no music for the sequence (and all motel scenes), but Herrmann insisted he try his composition. Afterward, Hitchcock agreed it vastly intensified the scene, and nearly doubled Herrmann's salary. The blood in the scene was Hershey's chocolate syrup, which shows up better on black-and-white film, and has more realistic density than stage blood. The sound of the knife entering flesh was created by plunging a knife into a casaba melon.

There are varying accounts whether Leigh was in the shower the entire time or a body double was used for some parts of the murder sequence and its aftermath. In an interview with Roger Ebert and, in the book by Stephen Rebello, Alfred Hitchcock and the Making of Psycho, Leigh stated she appeared in the scene the entire time and Hitchcock used a stand-in only for the sequence in which Norman wraps Marion's body in a shower curtain and places it in the trunk of her car. The 2010 book The Girl in Alfred Hitchcock's Shower by Robert Graysmith and the documentary 78/52: Hitchcock's Shower Scene contradicts this, identifying Marli Renfro as Leigh's body double for some of the shower scene's shots. Graysmith also stated that Hitchcock later acknowledged Renfro's participation in the scene. Rita Riggs, who was in charge of the wardrobe, claims it was Leigh in the shower the entire time, explaining that Leigh did not wish to be nude and so she devised strategic items including pasties, moleskin, and bodystockings, to be pasted on Leigh for the scene. Riggs and Leigh went through strip tease magazines that showed all the different costumes, but none of them worked because they all had tassels on them.

A popular myth emerged that ice-cold water was used in the shower scene to make Leigh's scream realistic. Leigh denied this on numerous occasions, saying the crew was accommodating, using hot water throughout the week-long shoot. All of the screams are Leigh's. Another myth was that graphic designer Saul Bass directed the shower scene. This was denied by several figures associated with the film, including Leigh, who stated: "Absolutely not! I have emphatically said this in any interview I've ever given. I've said it to his face in front of other people ... I was in that shower for seven days, and, believe me, Alfred Hitchcock was right next to his camera for every one of those seventy-odd shots". Hilton A. Green, the assistant director, also rebuts Bass's claim: "There is not a shot in that movie that I didn't roll the camera for. And I can tell you I never rolled the camera for Mr. Bass". Roger Ebert, a longtime admirer of Hitchcock's work, summarily dismissed the rumor: "It seems unlikely that a perfectionist with an ego like Hitchcock's would let someone else direct such a scene".

Commentators such as Stephen Rebello and Bill Krohn have argued in favor of Bass's contribution to the scene in his capacity as visual consultant and storyboard artist. Along with designing the opening credits, Bass is termed "Pictorial Consultant" in the credits. When interviewing Hitchcock in 1967, François Truffaut asked about the extent of Bass's contribution, to which Hitchcock replied that in addition to the titles, Bass had provided storyboards for the Arbogast murder (which he claimed to have rejected), but made no mention of Bass's having provided storyboards for the shower scene.

According to Bill Krohn's Hitchcock At Work, Bass's first claim to have directed the scene was in 1970, when he provided a magazine with 48 drawings used as storyboards as proof of his contribution. Krohn's analysis of the production, while rebutting Bass's claims for having directed the scene, notes that these storyboards did introduce key aspects of the final scene—most notably, the fact that the killer appears as a silhouette, and details such as the close-ups of the slashing knife, Leigh's desperate outstretched arm, the shower curtain being torn off its hooks, and the transition from the drain to Marion Crane's dead eye. Krohn notes that this final transition is highly reminiscent of the iris titles that Bass created for Vertigo. Krohn also notes that Hitchcock shot the scene with two cameras: one a BNC Mitchell, the other a handheld French Éclair camera which Orson Welles had used in Touch of Evil (1958). In order to create an ideal montage for the greatest emotional impact on the audience, Hitchcock shot a lot of footage of this scene which he trimmed down in the editing room. He even brought a Moviola on the set to gauge the footage required. The final sequence, which his editor George Tomasini worked on with Hitchcock's advice, however did not go far beyond the basic structural elements set up by Bass's storyboards.

According to Donald Spoto in The Dark Side of Genius and to Stephen Rebello in Alfred Hitchcock and the Making of Psycho, Hitchcock's wife and trusted collaborator, Alma Reville, spotted a blooper in one of the last edits of Psycho before its official release: after Marion was supposedly dead, one could see her blink. According to Patricia Hitchcock, talking in Laurent Bouzereau's "making of" documentary, Alma spotted that Leigh's character appeared to take a breath. In either case, the postmortem activity was edited out and was never seen by audiences. Although Marion's eyes should be dilated after her death, the contact lenses necessary for this effect would have required six weeks of acclimation to wear them, so Hitchcock decided to forgo them.

It is often claimed that, despite its graphic nature, the shower scene never once shows a knife puncturing flesh. However, a frame by frame analysis of the sequence shows one shot in which the knife appears to penetrate Leigh's abdomen, but the effect was created by lighting and reverse motion. Leigh herself was so affected by this scene when she saw it, that she no longer took showers unless she absolutely had to; she would lock all the doors and windows and would leave the bathroom and shower door open. She never realized until she first watched the film "how vulnerable and defenseless one is".

Before production, Leigh and Hitchcock fully discussed what the scene meant:

Film theorist Robin Wood also discusses how the shower washes "away her guilt". He comments upon the "alienation effect" of killing off the "apparent center of the film" with which spectators had identified. The scene was the subject of Alexandre O. Philippe's 2017 documentary 78/52: Hitchcock's Shower Scene, the title of which references the putative number of cuts and set-ups, respectively, that Hitchcock used to shoot it.

Soundtrack

Score
Hitchcock insisted that Bernard Herrmann write the score for Psycho despite the composer's refusal to accept a reduced fee for the film's lower budget. The resulting score, according to Christopher Palmer in The Composer in Hollywood (1990) is "perhaps Herrmann's most spectacular Hitchcock achievement". Hitchcock was pleased with the tension and drama the score added to the film, later remarking "33% of the effect of Psycho was due to the music" and that "Psycho depended heavily on Herrmann's music for its tension and sense of pervading doom".

Herrmann used the lowered music budget to his advantage by writing for a string orchestra rather than a full symphonic ensemble, contrary to Hitchcock's request for a jazz score. He thought of the single tone color of the all-string soundtrack as a way of reflecting the black-and-white cinematography of the film. The strings play con sordini (muted) for all the music other than the shower scene, creating a darker and more intense effect. Film composer Fred Steiner, in an analysis of the score to Psycho, points out that string instruments gave Herrmann access to a wider range in tone, dynamics, and instrumental special effects than any other single instrumental group would have.

The main title music, a tense, hurtling piece, sets the tone of impending violence, and returns three times on the soundtrack. Though nothing shocking occurs during the first 15–20 minutes of the film, the title music remains in the audience's mind, lending tension to these early scenes. Herrmann also maintains tension through the slower moments in the film through the use of ostinato.

There were rumors that Herrmann had used electronic means, including amplified bird screeches to achieve the shocking effect of the music in the shower scene. The effect was achieved, however, only with violins in a "screeching, stabbing sound-motion of extraordinary viciousness". The only electronic amplification employed was in the placing of the microphones close to the instruments, to get a harsher sound. Besides the emotional impact, the shower scene cue ties the soundtrack to birds. The association of the shower scene music with birds also telegraphs to the audience that it is Norman, the stuffed-bird collector, who is the murderer rather than his mother.

Herrmann biographer Steven C. Smith writes that the music for the shower scene is "probably the most famous (and most imitated) cue in film music", but Hitchcock was originally opposed to having music in this scene. When Herrmann played the shower scene cue for Hitchcock, the director approved its use in the film. Herrmann reminded Hitchcock of his instructions not to score this scene, to which Hitchcock replied: "Improper suggestion, my boy, improper suggestion". This was one of two important disagreements Hitchcock had with Herrmann, in which Herrmann ignored Hitchcock's instructions. The second one, over the score for Torn Curtain (1966), resulted in the end of their professional collaboration. A survey conducted by PRS for Music, in 2009, showed that the British public consider the score from 'the shower scene' to be the scariest theme from any film.

To honor the fiftieth anniversary of Psycho, in July 2010, the San Francisco Symphony obtained a print of the film with the soundtrack removed, and projected it on a large screen in Davies Symphony Hall while the orchestra performed the score live. This was previously mounted by the Seattle Symphony in October 2009 as well, performing at the Benaroya Hall for two consecutive evenings.

Recordings
Several CDs of the film score have been released, including:
 The October 2, 1975 recording with Bernard Herrmann conducting the National Philharmonic Orchestra [Unicorn CD, 1993].
 The 1997 Varèse Sarabande CD features a re-recording of the complete score performed by the Royal Scottish National Orchestra and conducted by Joel McNeely.
 The 1998 Soundstage Records SCD 585 CD claims to feature the tracks from the original master tapes, but it has been asserted that the release is a bootleg recording.
 The 2011 Doxy Records DOY650 (Italy) 180 gram LP release of the complete original score conducted by Herrmann.

Censorship and taboos

Psycho is a prime example of the type of film that appeared in the United States during the 1960s after the erosion of the Production Code. It was unprecedented in its depiction of sexuality and violence, right from the opening scene in which Sam and Marion are shown as lovers sharing the same bed, with Marion in a bra. In the Production Code standards of that time, unmarried couples shown in the same bed would have been taboo.

Another issue was the gender nonconformity. Perkins, who was allegedly a homosexual, and Hitchcock, who previously made Rope, were both experienced in the film's transgressive subject matter. The viewer is unaware of Bates' crossdressing until, at the end of the film, it is revealed during the attempted murder of Lila. At the station, Sam asks why Bates was dressed that way. The police officer, ignorant of Bates' split personality, announces his conclusion that Bates is a transvestite. The psychiatrist corrects him and explains that Bates believes that he is his own mother when he dresses in her clothes.

According to Stephen Rebello's 1990 book Alfred Hitchcock and the Making of Psycho, the censors in charge of enforcing the Production Code wrangled with Hitchcock because some of them insisted they could see one of Leigh's breasts. Hitchcock held onto the print for several days, left it untouched, and resubmitted it for approval. Each of the censors reversed their positions: those who had previously seen the breast now did not, and those who had not, now did. They passed the film after the director removed one shot that showed the buttocks of Leigh's stand-in. The board was also upset by the racy opening, so Hitchcock said that if they let him keep the shower scene he would re-shoot the opening with them on the set. Because board members did not show up for the re-shoot, the opening stayed.

Another cause of concern for the censors was that Marion was shown flushing a toilet, with its contents (torn-up note paper) fully visible. No flushing toilet had appeared in mainstream film and television in the United States at that time.

Internationally, Hitchcock was forced to make minor changes to the film, mostly to the shower scene. In the United Kingdom, the British Board of Film Classification (BBFC) required cuts to stabbing sounds and visible nude shots, and in New Zealand the shot of Norman washing blood from his hands was seen as disgusting. In Singapore, though the shower scene was left untouched, the murder of Arbogast and a shot of Norman's mother's corpse were removed. In Ireland, censor Gerry O'Hara banned it upon his initial viewing in 1960. The next year, a highly edited version missing some 47 feet of film was submitted to the Irish censor. O'Hara ultimately requested that an additional seven cuts be made: the line where Marion tells Sam to put his shoes on (which implied that he earlier had his pants or trousers off), two shots of Norman spying on Marion through the hole in the wall, Marion's undressing, the shots of Marion's blood flowing down the shower, the shots of Norman washing his hands when blood is visible, incidents of multiple stabbings ("One stab is surely enough", wrote O'Hara), the words "in bed" from the sheriff's wife's line, "Norman found them dead together in bed", and Arbogast's questions to Norman about whether he spent the night with Marion. In 1986, the uncut version of Psycho was accepted by the BBFC, who classified it at 15.

In 2020, Universal Pictures released the uncut version of the film on Blu-ray for the first time.

Release 
The film was released on June 16, 1960, at the DeMille Theatre and the Baronet Theatre in New York City. It was the first film sold in the US on the basis that no one would be admitted to the theater after the film had started.

Hitchcock's "no late admission" policy for the film was unusual for the time. It was not an entirely original publicity strategy as Clouzot had done the same in France for Les Diaboliques (1955). Hitchcock believed people who entered the theater late and thus never saw the appearance of star actress Janet Leigh would feel cheated. At first theater owners opposed the idea, thinking they would lose business. However, after the first day, the owners enjoyed long lines of people waiting to see the film. Shortly before the release of Psycho, Hitchcock promised a film in "the Diabolique manner".

The week after the New York premiere, the film opened at the Paramount Theatre, Boston; the Woods Theatre, Chicago and the Arcadia Theatre, Philadelphia. After nine weeks of release at the DeMille and the Baronet, the film was released in neighborhood New York theaters, the first time a film had played on Broadway and the neighborhood theaters simultaneously.

Promotion

Hitchcock did most of the promotion himself, forbidding Leigh and Perkins to make the usual television, radio, and print interviews for fear of them revealing the plot. Even critics were not given private screenings but rather had to see the film with the general public, which may have affected their reviews.

The film's original trailer features a jovial Hitchcock taking the viewer on a tour of the set, and almost giving away plot details before stopping himself. It is "tracked" with Herrmann's Psycho theme, but also jovial music from Hitchcock's comedy The Trouble with Harry; most of Hitchcock's dialogue is post-synchronized. The trailer was made after completion of the film, and because Janet Leigh was no longer available for filming, Hitchcock had Vera Miles don a blonde wig and scream loudly as he pulled the shower curtain back in the bathroom sequence of the preview. Because the title Psycho instantly covers most of the screen, the switch went unnoticed by audiences for years. However, a freeze-frame analysis clearly reveals that it is Miles and not Leigh in the shower during the trailer.

Rating 
Psycho has been rated and re-rated several times over the years by the MPAA. Upon its initial release, the film received a certificate stating that it was "Approved" (certificate #19564) under the simple pass/fail system of the Production Code in use at that time. Later, when the MPAA switched to a voluntary letter ratings system in 1968, Psycho was one of a number of high-profile motion pictures to be retro-rated with an "M" (Suggested for mature audiences: Parental discretion advised). This remained the only rating the film would receive for 16 years, and according to the guidelines of the time "M" was the equivalent of a "PG" rating. In 1984, amidst a controversy surrounding the levels of violence depicted in "PG"-rated films in the VCR era, the film was re-classified to its current rating of "R".

Re-release
The film had another successful theatrical reissue in 1969.

The film was re-released to cinemas on September 20 and 23, 2015, as part of the "TCM Presents" series by Turner Classic Movies and Fathom Events.

Television
CBS purchased the television rights for $450,000. CBS planned to televise the film on September 23, 1966, as an installment of its new movie night The CBS Friday Night Movies. Three days prior to the scheduled telecast, Valerie Percy, daughter of Illinois senate candidate Charles H. Percy, was murdered. As her parents slept mere feet away, she was stabbed a dozen times with a double-edged knife. In light of the murder, CBS agreed to postpone the broadcast. As a result of the Apollo 1 fire on January 27, 1967, the network washed its hands of Psycho.

Shortly afterward Paramount included the film in its first syndicated package of post-1950 movies, "Portfolio I". WABC-TV in New York City was the first station in the country to air Psycho (with some scenes significantly edited), on its late-night movie series, The Best of Broadway, on June 24, 1967.

The film finally made its way to general television broadcast in one of Universal's syndicated programming packages for local stations in 1970. Psycho was aired for 20 years in this format, then leased to cable for two years before returning to syndication as part of the "List of a Lifetime" package.

Home media 
The film has been released several times on VHS, LaserDisc, DVD and Blu-ray. DiscoVision first released Psycho on the LaserDisc format in "standard play" (5 sides) in 1979, and "extended play" (2 sides) in October 1981. MCA/Universal Home Video released a new LaserDisc version of Psycho in August 1988 (Catalog #: 11003). In May 1998, Universal Studios Home Video released a deluxe edition of Psycho as part of their Signature Collection. This THX-certified Widescreen (1.85:1) LaserDisc Deluxe Edition (Catalog #: 43105) is spread across 4 extended play sides and 1 standard play side, and includes a new documentary and isolated Bernard Herrmann score. A DVD edition was released at the same time as the LaserDisc.

A version of the film with extended footage of Marion undressing (showing her taking off her bra), Norman cleaning up after the murder, and Arbogast's death (in which he is stabbed four times instead of two) has been shown on German TV, and was released there on Blu-ray in 2015. This footage had been cut from the US version of the film in 1968 before the re-release of the movie after the ratings system was first established by the MPAA; these cuts were mandated by the National Legion of Decency.

For the DVD release, Laurent Bouzereau produced a documentary looking at the film's production and reception. Universal released a 50th anniversary edition on Blu-ray in the United Kingdom on August 9, 2010, with Australia making the same edition (with a different cover) available on September 1. To mark the film's 50th anniversary, a Blu-ray in the U.S. was released on October 19, 2010, featuring yet another cover. The film is also included on two different Alfred Hitchcock Blu-ray box-sets from Universal.

The film was released on 4K UHD Blu-Ray as part of The Alfred Hitchcock Classics Collection in September 2020, along with an individual "60th anniversary" Blu-Ray release as well. This release includes the extended footage from the German release, making it the first time since 1968 that these scenes were presented to US home video audiences as Hitchcock intended.

Reception

Critical reception
Initial reviews of the film were mixed. Bosley Crowther of The New York Times wrote: "There is not an abundance of subtlety or the lately familiar Hitchcock bent toward significant and colorful scenery in this obviously low-budget job". Crowther called the "slow buildups to sudden shocks" reliably melodramatic but contested Hitchcock's psychological points, reminiscent of Krafft-Ebing's studies, as less effective. While the film did not conclude satisfactorily for the critic, he commended the cast's performances as "fair". British critic C. A. Lejeune was so offended that she not only walked out before the end but permanently resigned her post as film critic for The Observer. Other negative reviews stated, "a blot on an honorable career", "plainly a gimmick movie", and "merely one of those television shows padded out to two hours". The Catholic Legion of Decency gave the film a B rating, meaning "morally objectionable in part".

Critics from other New York newspapers, such as the Daily News, Daily Mirror, and Village Voice were positive, writing, "Anthony Perkins' performance is the best of his career ... Janet Leigh has never been better", "played out beautifully", and "first American movie since Touch of Evil (1958) to stand in the same creative rank as the great European films", respectively. A mixed review from the New York Herald Tribunes review stated it was "rather difficult to be amused at the forms insanity may take [but nonetheless] keeps your attention like a snake-charmer". The Los Angeles Times''' Philip K. Scheuer remarked, in another mixed review, that the film was "one of his most brilliantly directed shockers and also his most disagreeable". The film ranked 9th on Cahiers du Cinéma's Top 10 Films of the Year List in 1960.

It was also well-received in Florida, where the Miami Herald's Jack Anderson wrote that "the pudgy master of suspense has dished up a real shocker. And I mean shocker. Psycho saws away at every nerve right from its first scene with Janet Leigh in her unmentionables to its last gruesome moment." Robin Barrett of the St. Petersburg Times wrote that "it's got all the ingredients of a typical Hitchcock, if Hitchcock can be termed in any way "typical," and it's definitely his best effort to date, but it's unlike anything he's done in the past. Mr. H. has pledged us not to reveal the shocking ending or talk about the bizarre plot and shaking fear of diabolical Hitchcock reprisals we won't."

A critic who used the Mae Tinee pseudonym in the Chicago Daily Tribune wrote that "the old pro really poured it on in this production. I'm sure the wily Mr. Hitchcock had fun making this one. He used his camera with a sharp skill to achieve shock value the staring eye, the flowing blood, the sudden plunge of a knife. Audiences react much as they do on a high ride, giggling with nerves and excitement." In Buffalo, Jeanette Eichel of the Buffalo Evening News remarked that "Alfred Hitchcock, master of mystery, fuses fear and suspense in his shiver-and-shock show "Psycho" in the Paramount Theater. His pride is that he does not let an audience down by misleading it. His clues are honest and few persons guess the outcome. He especially asked in an epilogue that patrons not betray the ending." A more mixed review came courtesy of Marjory Adams of the Boston Daily Globe, who wrote that "it is far more macabre and mysterious than any of his previous full-length features. However, the settings are dreary and lack those magnificent backgrounds which Hitchcock employed so effectively in North by Northwest, Vertigo and To Catch a Thief. Perhaps the old mystery master has been more influenced in Psycho by his television programs than by his own classics such as 39 Steps and Notorious. However, he gives the audience its money's worth. You see two murders committed, with accompanying core and grisly details. There are so many shocks the theater might be connected to an electric battery." Helen Bower of the Detroit Free Press was appalled by the film, opening her article by writing, "Gee, whiz, Mr. Hitchcock! Stick to making pictures like North by Northwest, instead of one like Psycho at the Palms Theater, will you, huh? So okay, Psycho gets some nervous laughter and a couple of yips of shock from the audience. But when even the great Hitchcock tries to make visual the dark side of star Anthony Perkins psychopathic personality, the effect is ridiculous. Perhaps the get-up would be the only thing a young man in Perkins' state of mind could produce. All the same it makes this phase of Hitch's horror movie look laughably corny."

In the United Kingdom, the film broke attendance records at the London Plaza Cinema, but nearly all British film critics gave it poor reviews, questioning Hitchcock's taste and judgment and calling it his worst film ever. Reasons cited for this were the lack of preview screenings; the fact that they had to turn up at a set time as they would not be admitted after the film had started; their dislike of the gimmicky promotion; and Hitchcock's expatriate status.

Critics later reassessed the film far more positively. Time magazine switched its opinion from "Hitchcock bears down too heavily in this one" to "superlative" and "masterly", and Bosley Crowther changed his initial opinion and included it in his Top Ten list of 1960, deeming it a "bold psychological mystery picture.... [I]t represented expert and sophisticated command of emotional development with cinematic techniques".Psycho was criticized for causing other filmmakers to show gory content; three years later, Blood Feast, considered to be the first "splatter film", was released. Inspired by Psycho, Hammer Film Productions launched a series of mystery thrillers including The Nanny (1965) starring Bette Davis and William Castle's Homicidal (1961) was followed by a slew of more than thirteen other splatter films.

On the review aggregator website Rotten Tomatoes, Psycho has an approval rating of 96% based on 110 reviews, with an average score of 9.30/10. The site's critical consensus reads: "Infamous for its shower scene, but immortal for its contribution to the horror genre. Because Psycho was filmed with tact, grace, and art, Hitchcock didn't just create modern horror, he validated it". On Metacritic, the film has a weighted average score of 97 out of 100 based on 18 critics, indicating "universal acclaim". In his 1998 review of Psycho film critic Roger Ebert summarised the film's enduring appeal, writing: 

Box office
In its opening week, Psycho grossed $46,500 at the DeMille and a record $19,500 at the Baronet. Following its expansion the following week, it grossed $143,000 from 5 theaters.Psycho broke box-office records in Japan and the rest of Asia, France, Britain, South America, the United States, and Canada, and was a moderate success in Australia for a brief period.

It went on to become the second highest-grossing film of 1960, behind Spartacus, earning a box office gross of $32 million, which generated approximately $9.1 million in North American theatrical rentals.Psycho remains the most commercially successful film of Hitchcock's career. Hitchcock personally earned in excess of $15 million from Psycho. He then swapped his rights to Psycho and his TV anthology for 150,000 shares of MCA, making him the third largest shareholder in MCA Inc., and his own boss at Universal, in theory; this did not stop them from interfering with his later films.<ref>Stephen Rebello, Alfred Hitchcock and the Making of Psycho, Soft Skull Press, Berkeley, 1990.</ref>

Themes and style

Subversion of romance through irony
In Psycho, Hitchcock subverts the romantic elements that are seen in most of his work. The film is instead ironic as it presents "clarity and fulfillment" of romance. The past is central to the film; the main characters "struggle to understand and resolve destructive personal histories" and ultimately fail. Lesley Brill writes: "The inexorable forces of past sins and mistakes crush hopes for regeneration and present happiness". The crushed hope is highlighted by the death of the protagonist, Marion Crane, halfway through the film. Marion is like Persephone of Greek mythology, who is abducted temporarily from the world of the living. The myth does not sustain with Marion, who dies hopelessly in her room at the Bates Motel. The room is wallpapered with floral print like Persephone's flowers, but they are only "reflected in mirrors, as images of images—twice removed from reality". In the scene of Marion's death, Brill describes the transition from the bathroom drain to Marion's lifeless eye, "like the eye of the amorphous sea creature at the end of Fellini's La Dolce Vita, it marks the birth of death, an emblem of final hopelessness and corruption".

Marion is deprived of "the humble treasures of love, marriage, home and family", which Hitchcock considers elements of human happiness. There exists among Psychos secondary characters a lack of "familial warmth and stability", which demonstrates the unlikelihood of domestic fantasies. The film contains ironic jokes about domesticity, such as when Sam writes a letter to Marion, agreeing to marry her, only after the audience sees her buried in the swamp. Sam and Marion's sister Lila, in investigating Marion's disappearance, develop an "increasingly connubial" relationship, a development that Marion is denied. Norman also suffers a similarly perverse definition of domesticity. He has "an infantile and divided personality" and lives in a mansion whose past occupies the present. Norman displays stuffed birds that are "frozen in time" and keeps childhood toys and stuffed animals in his room. He is hostile toward suggestions to move from the past, such as with Marion's suggestion to put
his mother "someplace" and as a result kills Marion to preserve his past. Brill explains: Someplace' for Norman is where his delusions of love, home, and family are declared invalid and exposed".

Light and darkness feature prominently in Psycho. The first shot after the intertitle is the sunny landscape of Phoenix before the camera enters a dark hotel room where Sam and Marion appear as bright figures. Marion is almost immediately cast in darkness; she is preceded by her shadow as she reenters the office to steal money and as she enters her bedroom. When she flees Phoenix, darkness descends on her drive. The following sunny morning is punctured by a watchful police officer with black sunglasses, and she finally arrives at the Bates Motel in near darkness. Bright lights are also "the ironic equivalent of darkness" in the film, blinding instead of illuminating. Examples of brightness include the opening window shades in Sam's and Marion's hotel room, vehicle headlights at night, the neon sign at the Bates Motel, "the glaring white" of the bathroom tiles where Marion dies, and the fruit cellar's exposed light bulb shining on the corpse of Norman's mother. Such bright lights typically characterize danger and violence in Hitchcock's films.

Motifs
The film often features shadows, mirrors, windows, and, less so, water. The shadows are present from the first scene where the blinds make bars on Marion and Sam as they peer out of the window. The stuffed birds' shadows loom over Marion as she eats, and Norman's mother is seen in only shadows until the  end. More subtly, backlighting turns the rakes in the hardware store into talons above Lila's head.

Mirrors reflect Marion as she packs, her eyes as she checks the rear-view mirror, her face in the policeman's sunglasses, and her hands as she counts out the money in the car dealership's bathroom. A motel window serves as a mirror by reflecting Marion and Norman together. Hitchcock shoots through Marion's windshield and the telephone booth, when Arbogast phones Sam and Lila. The heavy downpour can be seen as a foreshadowing of the shower, and its cessation can be seen as a symbol of Marion making up her mind to return to Phoenix.

There are a number of references to birds. Norman's hobby is stuffing birds. Marion's last name is Crane and she is from Phoenix. (In the novel, Norman's hobby is taxidermy but it is not focused on birds, and Marion is from Dallas, Texas.) Norman comments that she eats like a bird. The motel room has pictures of birds on the wall. Brigitte Peucker also suggests that Norman's hobby of stuffing birds literalizes the British slang expression for sex, "stuffing birds", bird being British slang for a desirable woman. Robert Allan suggests that Norman's mother is his original "stuffed bird", both in the sense of having preserved her body and the incestuous nature of Norman's emotional bond with her.

Psychoanalytic interpretation
Psycho has been called "the first psychoanalytical thriller". The sex and violence in the film were unlike anything previously seen in a mainstream film. French film critic Serge Kaganski wrote: "The shower scene is both feared and desired. Hitchcock may be scaring his female viewers out of their wits, but he is turning his male viewers into potential rapists because Janet Leigh has been turning men on ever since she appeared in her brassiere in the first scene".

In his documentary The Pervert's Guide to Cinema, Slavoj Žižek remarks that Norman Bates' mansion has three floors, paralleling the three levels of the human mind that are postulated by Freudian psychoanalysis: the top floor would be the superego, where Bates' mother lives; the ground floor is then Bates' ego, where he functions as an apparently normal human being; and the basement would be Bates' id. Žižek interprets Bates' moving his mother's corpse from top floor to basement as a symbol for the deep connection that psychoanalysis posits between superego and id.

Accolades

In 1992, the film was deemed "culturally, historically, or aesthetically significant" by the United States Library of Congress and was selected for preservation in the National Film Registry. In 1998, TV Guide ranked it #8 on their list of the 50 Greatest Movies on TV (and Video).

Psycho has appeared on a number of lists by websites, television channels, and magazines. The shower scene was featured as number four on the list of Bravo Network's 100 Scariest Movie Moments, whilst the finale was ranked number four on Premieres similar list. In the British Film Institute's 2012 Sight & Sound polls of the greatest films ever made, Psycho was 35th among critics and 48th among directors. In the earlier 2002 version of the list the film ranked 35th among critics and 19th among directors. In the 2022 edition of BFI's Greatest films of all time list the film ranked 31st in the critics poll and 46th in the director's poll. In 1998 Time Out conducted a reader's poll and Psycho was voted the 29th greatest film of all time. The Village Voice ranked Psycho at No. 19 in its Top 250 "Best Films of the Century" list in 1999, based on a poll of critics. The film was listed as one of TCM's top 15 most influential films of all time list. Entertainment Weekly voted it the 11th Greatest film of all time in 1999. In January 2002, the film was voted at No. 72 on the list of the "Top 100 Essential Films of All Time" by the National Society of Film Critics. The film was included in Times All-Time 100 best movies list in 2005. In 2005, Total Film magazine ranked Psycho as the 6th-greatest horror film of all time. In 2010, The Guardian newspaper ranked it as "the best horror film of all time". Director Martin Scorsese included Psycho in his list of the 11 scariest horror films of all time. The film was named as the third best horror movie of all time in a readers' poll by Rolling Stone magazine in 2014. In 2017 Empire magazine's reader's poll ranked Psycho at No. 53 on its list of The 100 Greatest Movies. In an earlier poll held by the same magazine in 2008, it was voted 45th on the list of "The 500 Greatest Movies of All Time". In 2021, the film was ranked at No. 5 by Time Out on their list of "The 100 best horror movies".

In 2012, the Motion Picture Editors Guild listed the film as the twelfth best-edited film of all time based on a survey of its membership. Psycho was ranked 8th in BBC's 2015 list of the 100 greatest American films.

In 2022, Variety named Psycho the greatest movie of all time. 

American Film Institute has included Psycho in these lists:
 AFI's 100 Years ... 100 Movies – #18
 AFI's 100 Years ... 100 Thrills – #1
 AFI's 100 Years ... 100 Heroes and Villains:
 Norman Bates – #2 Villain
 AFI's 100 Years ... 100 Movie Quotes:
 "A boy's best friend is his mother." – #56
 AFI's 100 Years of Film Scores – #4
 AFI's 100 Years ... 100 Movies (10th Anniversary Edition) – #14

Legacy
Psycho has become one of the most recognizable films in cinema history, and is arguably Hitchcock's best known film. In his novel, Bloch used an uncommon plot structure: he repeatedly introduced sympathetic protagonists, then killed them off. This played on his reader's expectations of traditional plots, leaving them uncertain and anxious. Hitchcock recognized the effect this approach could have on audiences, and utilized it in his adaptation, killing off Leigh's character at the end of the first act. This daring plot device, coupled with the fact that the character was played by the biggest box-office name in the film, was a shocking turn of events in 1960.

The shower scene has become a pop culture touchstone and is often regarded as one of the most iconic moments in cinematic history, as well as the most suspenseful scene ever filmed. Its effectiveness is often credited to the use of startling editing techniques borrowed from the Soviet montage filmmakers, and to the iconic screeching violins in Bernard Herrmann's musical score. In 2000 The Guardian ranked the shower scene at No. 2 on their list of "The top 10 film moments". The scene has been frequently parodied and referenced in popular culture, complete with the screeching violin sound effects (such as Charlie and the Chocolate Factory, among many others). 78/52: Hitchcock's Shower Scene, a documentary on its production by Alexandre O. Philippe, was released on October 13, 2017. It features interviews with and analysis by Guillermo del Toro, Peter Bogdanovich, Bret Easton Ellis, Jamie Lee Curtis, Karyn Kusama, Eli Roth, Oz Perkins, Leigh Whannell, Walter Murch, Danny Elfman, Elijah Wood, Richard Stanley, and Neil Marshall.

Psycho is considered by some to be the first film in the slasher film genre, though some critics and film historians point to Michael Powell's Peeping Tom, a lesser-known film with similar themes of voyeurism and sexualized violence, whose release happened to precede Psychos by a few months. However, due to Peeping Toms critical drubbing at the time and short lifespan at the box office, Psycho was the more widely known and influential film.

Psycho has been referenced in other films numerous times: examples include the 1974 musical comedy horror film Phantom of the Paradise; the 1978 horror film Halloween (which starred Jamie Lee Curtis, Janet Leigh's daughter, and which featured a character Sam Loomis); the 1977 Mel Brooks tribute to many of Hitchcock's thrillers, High Anxiety; the 1980 Fade to Black; the 1980 Dressed to Kill; and Wes Craven's 1996 horror satire Scream. Bernard Herrmann's opening theme has been sampled by rapper Busta Rhymes on his song "Gimme Some More" (1998). Manuel Muñoz's 2011 novel What You See in the Dark includes a sub-plot that fictionalizes elements of the filming of Psycho, referring to Hitchcock and Leigh only as "The Director" and "The Actress". In the comic book stories of Jonni Future, the house inherited by the title character is patterned after the Bates Motel. The film was played alongside The Shining at the drive-in theater as part of the Night of Horrors combo in the 1996 film Twister. In the 2003 animated film Finding Nemo, the dentist's niece Darla repeatedly plays the Psycho theme song.

The film boosted Perkins' career, but he soon began to suffer from typecasting. When Perkins was asked whether he would have still taken the role knowing that he would be typecast afterwards, he said "yes". As Perkins was in New York working on a Broadway stage show when the shower sequence was filmed, actresses Anne Dore and Margo Epper stepped in as his body doubles for that scene. Until her death in 2004, Leigh received strange and sometimes threatening calls, letters, and even tapes detailing what the caller would like to do to Marion Crane. One letter was so "grotesque" that she passed it to the FBI. Two agents visited Leigh and told her the culprits had been located and that she should notify the FBI if she received any more letters of that type.

Leigh said: "No other murder mystery in the history of the movies has inspired such merchandising". A number of items emblazoned with Bates Motel, stills, lobby cards, and highly valuable posters are available for purchase. In 1992 Innovation Comics published a three-issue, shot-for-shot comics miniseries adaptation of the film.

Metalcore band Ice Nine Kills released a song on their most recent album The Silver Scream 2: Welcome to Horrorwood called "The Shower Scene", which pays homage to the film.

The film was mentioned and a trademark of its soundtrack was also used in Billy Joel's song We Didn't Start the Fire.

Sequels and remake

Three sequels were produced after Hitchcock died: Psycho II (1983), Psycho III (1986), and Psycho IV: The Beginning (1990), the last being a part-prequel television movie written by the original screenplay author, Joseph Stefano. Anthony Perkins returned to his role of Norman Bates in all three sequels, and also directed the third film. The voice of Norman Bates' mother was maintained by noted radio actress Virginia Gregg with the exception of Psycho IV, where the role was played by Olivia Hussey. Vera Miles also reprised her role of Lila Crane in Psycho II. The sequels received mixed reviews and were universally considered inferior to the original.

In 1998, Gus Van Sant made a nearly shot-for-shot remake (in color) starring Vince Vaughn, Julianne Moore, and Anne Heche. Van Sant said that his film was "a huge kind of experimental project", and that, though it did not do well commercially or critically, he may do it again, with more changes.

See also
 Bates Motel, a television series that ran from 2013 to 2017 presented as a "prequel" to Psycho, though set in modern times. Freddie Highmore played a younger Norman Bates, Vera Farmiga played Norma Bates and in the final season, Rihanna guest-starred as Marion Crane.
 False protagonist
 Hitchcock, a 2012 biopic film about Hitchcock and the making of Psycho with Anthony Hopkins as Hitchcock, Helen Mirren as his wife Alma Reville, Scarlett Johansson as Janet Leigh, and James D'Arcy as Anthony Perkins.
 List of American films of 1960

Notes

References

Further reading

Production of Psycho
 Anobile, Richard J.; editor. Alfred Hitchcock's Psycho (The Film Classics Library). Avon Books, 1974. This volume, published before the proliferation of home video, is entirely composed of photo reproductions of film frames along with dialogue captions, creating a fumetti of the entire motion picture.
 Durgnat, Raymond E. A Long Hard Look at Psycho (BFI Film Classics). British Film Institute, 2002.
 Kolker, Robert; editor. Alfred Hitchcock's Psycho: A Casebook. Oxford University Press, 2005.
 Naremore, James. Filmguide to Psycho. Indiana University Press, 1973.
 Rebello, Stephen. Alfred Hitchcock and the Making of Psycho. Dembner Books, 1990. A definitive "making of" account tracing every stage of the production of the film as well as its aftermath.
 Rebello, Stephen. "Psycho: The Making of Alfred Hitchcock's Masterpiece". "Cinefantastique", April 1986 (Volume 16, Number 4/5). Comprehensive 22-page article.
 Skerry, Philip J. The Shower Scene in Hitchcock's Psycho: Creating Cinematic Suspense and Terror. Lewiston, New York: Edwin Mellen Press, 2005.
 Smith, Joseph W., III. The Psycho File: A Comprehensive Guide to Hitchcock's Classic Shocker. McFarland, 2009.
 Thomson, David, The Moment of Psycho (2009)

External links

 Psycho essay  by Charles Taylor at National Film Registry
 
 
 
 
 
 
 
 Filmsite: Psycho In-depth analysis of the film
 Psycho and Bernard Herrmann film score
 "Psycho at 50: What We've Learned from Alfred Hitchcock's Horror Classic" by Gary Susman – Moviefone – June 15, 2010
 Psycho essay by Daniel Eagan in America's Film Legacy: The Authoritative Guide to the Landmark Movies in the National Film Registry, A&C Black, 2010 , pages 563-565 

Psycho (franchise) films
1960 films
1960 horror films
1960 LGBT-related films
1960s American films
1960s English-language films
1960s horror thriller films
1960s mystery thriller films
1960s psychological horror films
1960s psychological thriller films
1960s serial killer films
1960s slasher films
American black-and-white films
American LGBT-related films
American horror thriller films
American mystery horror films
American mystery thriller films
American psychological horror films
American psychological thriller films
American serial killer films
American slasher films
Articles containing video clips
Censored films
Cross-dressing in American films
Edgar Award-winning works
Films à clef
Films about dissociative identity disorder
Films about sexual repression
Films based on American horror novels
Films based on American thriller novels
Films based on works by Robert Bloch
Films directed by Alfred Hitchcock
Films featuring a Best Supporting Actress Golden Globe-winning performance
Films produced by Alfred Hitchcock
Films scored by Bernard Herrmann
Films set in 1959
Films set in 1960
Films set in California
Films set in Phoenix, Arizona
Films shot in California
Films with screenplays by Joseph Stefano
LGBT-related horror thriller films
Matricide in fiction
Paramount Pictures films
United States National Film Registry films